Thalli Prema ( Mother's Love) is a 1968 Telugu-language drama film, produced by M. Azam under the Azam Arts banner and directed by Srikanth. It stars N. T. Rama Rao, Savitri, and Ram Mohan with music composed by Sudarshanam. The film was remade in Tamil as Kulama Gunama (1971), in Hindi as Swarag Se Sunder (1986) and again in Telugu as Naa Ille Naa Swargam (1991).

Plot
The film begins in a village where President Kesava Rao (N. T. Rama Rao) lives with his wife Seeta (Savitri) and younger brother Venu (Ram Mohan), who adores them. Kesava Rao dedicated his time to improve the village. Besides, Viswaroopam (Nagabhushanam) holds a grocery store and makes malpractice when Kesava Rao open a government store that begrudges him and his wife Bhadramma (Chaya Devi). Here Bhadramma always affronts Seeta as sterile. Meanwhile, Venu loves and marries Lalitha (Kanchana), the benevolent daughter of Viswaroopam. Seeta and Lalitha are cordial and they build a jaunty world. The two conceive and deliver at once when Seeta is blessed with a baby boy, but Lalitha miscarries. During that plight, Kesava Rao and Seeta substitute their baby to safeguard Lalitha. Thereafter, discords arise in the family. Exploiting it, Viswaroopam and Bhadramma force Venu for his share. Listening to it, Kesava Rao collapses, surrenders to Venu, and quits. At the same time, the boy is injured, loses blood and Venu and Lalitha's blood group is unsuitable. During that plight, Seeta intervenes but is hindered by Viswaroopam and Bhadramma, but the doctor affirms the actuality. At last, Venu and Lalitha repent and return the child. The family finally reunites.

Cast
N. T. Rama Rao as Kesava Rao
Savitri as Seeta
Relangi as Major Kailasam 
Ram Mohan as Venu
Nagabhushanam as Viswaroopam
Padmanabham as Vajram
K. V. Chalam as Chalamaiah
Kanchana as Lalitha
Geetanjali as Vimala
Chaya Devi as Bhadramma

Soundtrack

Music composed by Sudarshanam. Music released by Audio Company.

References

External links

Indian drama films
Telugu films remade in other languages
1968 drama films
1968 films
Films scored by R. Sudarsanam